The Rule of Wen and Jing (180 BC – 141 BC) refers to the reigns of Emperor Wen of Han and his son Emperor Jing of Han, a period known for the benevolence and thriftiness of the emperors, reduction in tax and other burdens on the people, pacifism, and general stability.  The Rule of Wen and Jing was marked by Taoist influences in political theory, due to the influence of Emperor Wen's wife and Emperor Jing's mother, Empress Dou.  Taoist influence on government did not truly end until her death in 135 BC, during the reign of her grandson Emperor Wu of Han.

The Rule of Wen and Jing is often viewed as one of the golden ages in Chinese history, in particularly the Western Han dynasty, and it paved the way for the long and stable reign of Emperor Wu. It also enabled Emperor Wu to maintain a powerful army and employ an aggressive foreign policy, which greatly expanded the empire and ultimately pushed the Han dynasty to its zenith.  The main criticism against it, however, was that it made the rich richer and the poor poorer, due to the lack of mechanisms to redistribute wealth.

Emperor Wu's long reign of 54 years from 141 to 87 BC thoroughly depleted the empire's coffers, which took Emperor Wen and Jing decades to establish. The Han dynasty would not witness another golden age until the 1st century AD, during the rule of Emperors Ming and Zhang.

Han dynasty
2nd century BC in China